Bornaprolol is a beta-adrenergic antagonist.

References

Beta blockers
N-isopropyl-phenoxypropanolamines